Fazil Malikonge best known under his nickname Malik Jabir is a famous football player in Burundi who led his club Vital'O to the African Cup Winners' Cup final in 1992 before retiring from international competition in 1993 and is currently a customs agent in Burundi.

Career 
He was one of the most lethal and feared strikers in the history of football in Burundi who never had a chance to ply his trade overseas like most Burundian players before the 1993 war.

References

Burundian footballers
People from Bujumbura
Vital'O F.C. players
Living people
Association football forwards
Year of birth missing (living people)